Jenna Sudds (born February 8, 1979) is a Canadian politician who presently serves as the Parliamentary Secretary to the Minister of Women, Gender Equality, and Youth, as well as the Member of Parliament for Kanata—Carleton in the House of Commons of Canada. A member of the Liberal Party, she was elected in the 2021 Canadian federal election.

Previously, she served as Deputy Mayor of Ottawa and member of the Ottawa City Council for Kanata North (Ward 4). Sudds was elected to Ottawa City Council on October 22, 2018, and took office on December 1, 2018.

Career 
Sudds grew up in Niagara Falls, Ontario. Sudds attended Brock University in St. Catharines and moved to the National Capital Region in 2001 to complete her master's degree in economics at Carleton University. Sudds worked as an economist in the federal government for twelve years before becoming the inaugural President and executive director of the Kanata North Business Association, after being appointed to the role by a hiring committee that consisted of her predecessor on Council, Marianne Wilkinson. From November 2017 to November 2018, Sudds was the inaugural executive director at the CIO Strategy Council, a national technology council. In March 2018, she announced her decision to run for Ottawa City Council, Kanata North.

Sudds has been a longtime volunteer with the Kanata Food Cupboard and the Ottawa Network for Education. She has received a Special Recognition Award from the Kanata Food Cupboard for her leadership and service to those in need in the community. She received a Forty Under 40 Award from the Ottawa Business Journal and the Ottawa Chamber of Commerce in 2015, and was named one of Development Counsellors International's Top 40 under 40 working in economic development in 2017.

Politics 

Sudds was elected as a Liberal in Kanata—Carleton in the 2021 Canadian federal election, replacing outgoing Liberal Member of Parliament Karen McCrimmon.

44th Parliament 
Sudds was appointed to serve as the Parliamentary Secretary to the Minister of Women, Gender Equality, and Youth by Prime Minister Justin Trudeau on December 3, 2021. Sudds sits on the Standing Committee on the Status of Women as a voting member.

Throughout her tenure, Sudds has seconded, voted in favour of, and passed legislation advancing women's rights, affordable housing, and worker's rights. She supported legislation to ban the practice of conversion therapy, which passed the House of Commons in a unanimous vote. She has pushed for economic reforms to strengthen Canada's technology sector, particularly semiconductor fabrication and critical mineral development.

In foreign policy, she has supported sanctions against Russian political leaders and oligarchs in response to the 2022 Russian invasion of Ukraine, and sanctions against Iran following the Mahsa Amini protests. She concurred with a report by the House of Commons Standing Committee on Foreign Affairs and International Development which called for dialogue between "the Tibetan people and the government of the People's Republic of China with a view to enabling Tibet to exercise genuine autonomy within the framework of the Chinese constitution."

After the 2022 Russian invasion of Ukraine, Sudds was sanctioned by government of the Russian Federation after the Canadian government sanctioned many Russian officials close to Vladimir Putin over the Ukrainian invasion.

Awards 

Kanata North Citizen of the Year (2012-2013)
Forty Under 40 Award (2015) from the Ottawa Business Journal and Ottawa Board of Trade
40 Under 40 International Economic Development Professional Award (2016)

Electoral record

2021 Canadian federal election

2018 Ottawa municipal election

Personal life 
Sudds has three daughters.

References

External links 

Official website
Jenna Sudds – Parliament of Canada Voting Record

Ottawa city councillors
Living people
People from Niagara Falls, Ontario
People from Oakville, Ontario
Brock University alumni
1979 births
Women municipal councillors in Canada
Women members of the House of Commons of Canada
Liberal Party of Canada MPs
Members of the House of Commons of Canada from Ontario
Women in Ontario politics
21st-century Canadian women politicians